Karen Cross (born 19 February 1974) is a left-handed British former tennis player who competed at eight Wimbledon Championships during the 1990s and early 2000s, as well as for the Great Britain Fed Cup team in both 1994 and 1998. During the course of her career Cross managed to win six titles on the ITF circuit (3 in singles and 3 in doubles) and she achieved her highest Women's Tennis Association singles ranking of world number 134 on 22 June 1998. She is currently a part-time tennis coach at the Roehampton Club and since retirement from the professional circuit she has regularly competed on the ITF senior circuit, reaching a career-high ranking of world no.4 in the women's over-35's age group.

At the Grand Slams, Cross's best result came at Wimbledon in 1997 when she won three matches to qualify before defeating Linda Wild and María Sánchez Lorenzo to reach the third round where she was defeated by the reigning French Open champion, Iva Majoli, in three close sets.

Cross managed to gain victories over a number of players who would go on to achieve (or had already experienced)  great success on the WTA tour, the most notable being future two-time Australian Open champion and world number 2 Li Na (in December 1999) and future multiple Grand Slam doubles champion and doubles world number 1, Roberta Vinci (in July 2000). Other notable defeated opponents included future two-time WTA titlist and world number 19 Sybille Bammer, future world number 32 Jelena Kostanić, future one-time WTA titlist and world number 48 Milagros Sequera and former one-time WTA titlist and world number 56, Monique Javer.

ITF circuit finals

Singles (3–0)

Doubles (3–3)

Performance timelines

Singles

Doubles

Mixed doubles

Fed Cup

References

External links
 
 
 

1974 births
Living people
Sportspeople from Exeter
English female tennis players
English tennis coaches
British female tennis players
Tennis people from Devon